Dolichandra unguis-cati, commonly known as cat's claw creeper, funnel creeper, or cat's claw trumpet, is a rapidly growing climbing vine belonging to the family Bignoniaceae. It affects all plant layers of the forest ecosystem spreading rapidly both vertically and horizontally.

Description

Thin and small aerial roots are used for climbing. Leaves are dark green, opposite and bifoliate.

Flowers occur from late spring through to early summer. Their calyx is narrow trumpet-shaped, 1-2 centimeters long. Their corolla is also tubular and measures 4 to 10 centimeters long. The 5 lobes of the corolla have different sizes. The opening diameter is 1.2 to 2.4 centimeters. Each capsule contains 100 to 200 seeds.

Distribution and habitat
This plant is native to the tropical dry forest of Central America, South America (Mexico to Brazil and northern Argentina) and the Caribbean. It can become invasive due to its fast growth and it is present worldwide, often having been introduced as an ornamental plant to these regions. It can affect all layers of plants of forest ecosystems by rapidly spreading both vertically and horizontally.

It prefers fertile, well-drained soils but can survive in most soils except salty ones. It tolerates the lack of light well, but grows faster in the sun. It is naturalised in Australia, southeastern USA, southern Africa, tropical Asia. It grows in orchards and gardens, roadsides and grasslands, in open urban areas, especially in temperate to subtropical regions with medium to high rainfall. It spreads both horizontally, in contact with herbaceous plants, and vertically, up to the canopy.

Invasiveness
The eradication of this plant is difficult because of its rapid spread linked to the vast root system it develops and the profusion of its seeds. It survives grazing and wildfire, and disturbances tend to stimulate offspring production. The plant is said to be "one of the most destructive exotic vines", where it is especially aggressive in riparian zones and rainforest communities where it strangles trees.

Medicinal use
Its use has been documented as an antidote for snake bites in folk medicine. It is also used to treat dermatitis, in addition to being antipyretic. Furthermore, being anti-inflammatory, it has been used for the treatment of intestinal ailments, venereal disease, rheumatism, dysentery, malaria and oliguria. Its leaves revealed antitumoral and antitrypanosomal activities.

Gallery

References

Notes

Bibliography
 USDA
 Catalogue of Life

Bignoniaceae
Vines
Flora of Central America
Flora of Brazil
Flora of Mexico
Flora of Argentina
Flora of the Caribbean
Invasive plant species in Australia
Garden plants of Central America
Garden plants of South America
Flora without expected TNC conservation status